

Legislative Assembly elections

The State Assembly elections in India of 2006 took place between April 3, 2006 and May 8, 2006. The Indian states that went into poll are Assam, Kerala, Tamil Nadu, West Bengal and Puducherry.

Counting of votes for all the states was completed on May 11, 2006 and results were declared on May 20, 2006.

Assam

Elections in Assam for 65 ACs occurred on April 3, 2006 and another 61 ACs on April 10, 2006.

Kerala

Elections in Kerala for 65 ACs occurred on April 22, 2006, 61 ACs on April 29, 2006, and 15 ACs on May 3, 2006. The Communist Party of India (Marxist) (CPI(M))-led Left Democratic Front beat the incumbent Indian National Congress-led United Democratic Front by a margin of 56 seats (out of a total of 140 seats). V.S. Achuthanandan, of CPI (M) was sworn in as the 20th Chief Minister of Kerala, on May 18, 2006.

Tamil Nadu

Elections in Tamil Nadu for 234 ACs occurred in a single phase on May 8, 2006. The Dravida Munnetra Kazhagam (DMK)-led front won the elections, beating the incumbent All India Anna Dravida Munnetra Kazhagam (AIADMK)-led government. The DMK leader, M Karunanidhi was sworn in as chief minister.

West Bengal

Elections in West Bengal for 45 ACs occurred on April 17, 2006, 66 ACs on April 22, 2006, 77 ACs on April 27, 2006, 57 ACs on May 3, 2006, 49 ACs on May 8, 2006.

Puducherry

Elections in Puducherry for 3 ACs occurred on May 3, 2006 and 27 ACs on May 8, 2006.

References

External links

 Election Commission of India

2006 elections in India
India
2006 in India
Elections in India by year